The white-lined honeyeater (Territornis albilineata) is a species of bird in the family Meliphagidae. It is endemic to northern Australia.  Its natural habitat is subtropical or tropical moist lowland forests. It formerly included the Kimberley honeyeater as a subspecies.

References

white-lined honeyeater
Birds of the Northern Territory
white-lined honeyeater
Taxonomy articles created by Polbot
Taxobox binomials not recognized by IUCN